The 1977–78 Boston Celtics season was the 32nd season of the Boston Celtics in the National Basketball Association (NBA) and was linked to the Buffalo Braves season. While the Braves were struggling on the court, their owner John Y. Brown brokered a deal to take over the legendary Celtics franchise. Celtics owner Irv Levin wanted to move the franchise to California, however, the NBA would not allow him to take the cornerstone franchise out of Boston.

NBA lawyer and future commissioner David Stern offered a compromise in which Levin and Brown would swap franchises, so that Levin could take over the Braves and move them to San Diego. Eventually, the owners of the 22 franchises voted 21–1 to approve the deal, and the Braves moved from Buffalo to San Diego. The deal also included a 7-player trade in which the Celtics acquired Nate Archibald, Billy Knight and Marvin Barnes in exchange for  Freeman Williams, Kevin Kunnert, Kermit Washington and Sidney Wicks. The Braves would not request a draft pick in the deal, allowing the Celtics to retain the draft rights to future Hall of Famer Larry Bird.

The Braves played their last game of the season in Boston. It was one of only three seasons from 1951 to 1993 that the Celtics finished with a losing record. This was the 16th and final season for the legendary John Havlicek.  Nobody has played more seasons for the Celtics than Havlicek.

Draft picks

This table only displays picks through two rounds.

Roster

Regular season

Season standings

Record vs. opponents

References

Boston Celtics
Boston Celtics seasons
Boston Celtics
Boston Celtics
Celtics
Celtics